The Sports, Performing Arts, Culture and Publication functional constituency is a functional constituency in the elections for the Legislative Council of Hong Kong. The constituency is composed of corporate members of the Sports Federation & Olympic Committee of Hong Kong, China, Hong Kong Sports Institute, Hong Kong Publishing Federation and other designated associations of performing arts, broadcasting and culture.

Composition
After the major electoral overhaul in 2021, the Sports, Performing Arts, Culture and Publication functional constituency is composed of—
 corporate members of the Sports Federation & Olympic Committee of Hong Kong, China; and
 Hong Kong Sports Institute Limited; and
 corporate members of the Hong Kong Publishing Federation Limited entitled to vote at general meetings of the company; and
 19 designated performing arts industry associations and local licensed broadcasting institutions and 114 designated cultural public institutions, associations and bodies.

Return members

Electoral results

2020s

2010s

2000s

1990s

References

Constituencies of Hong Kong
Constituencies of Hong Kong Legislative Council
Functional constituencies (Hong Kong)
1998 establishments in Hong Kong
Constituencies established in 1998